Michel Parmentier (born 1 April 1948) is a French former footballer. He competed in the men's tournament at the 1968 Summer Olympics.

References

External links
 

1948 births
Living people
French footballers
Olympic footballers of France
Footballers at the 1968 Summer Olympics
Sportspeople from Seine-Maritime
Association football forwards
Footballers from Normandy